The Freebox is an ADSL-VDSL-FTTH modem and a set-top box that the French Internet service provider named Free (part of the Iliad group) provides to its DSL-FTTH subscribers.

Its main use is as a high-end fixed and wireless modem (802.11g MIMO), but it also allows Free to offer additional services over ADSL, such as IPTV including high definition (1080p), Video recording with timeshifting capabilities, digital radio and VoIP telephone service via one RJ-11 connector (the first version came with 2 such jacks but only one was ever activated)

The Freebox is provided free to the subscribers, its value being 190 Euros, according to the operator. It is delivered with a remote control, a multimedia box equipped with a 250 GB hard drive, and accessories (cables and filters). At the end of Q2 2005, more than 1.1 million subscribers were equipped with the Freebox.  According to company official's results publication, the 2 million level of Freeboxes were reached in September 2006.

V6 generation, Freebox Révolution
The sixth generation device is called the Freebox Révolution or V6 (Version 6). It was launched in early 2011. It is composed of a pair of devices: the ADSL modem/router and the IPTV set top box/media player. The boxes were designed by Philippe Starck.

The Freebox Server device
The Freebox server is a DSL modem, a router, a Wi-Fi hot spot, a NAS (250 GB hard drive), a DECT base with up to 8 connected DECT phone sets, and a digital video recorder for TNT also known as DVB-T and IPTV. As the firmware is updated, its functionalities increase. Most notably:
 An external hard drive can be connected to its USB and/or eSATA port. However, some TV channels cannot be recorded to an external hard drive due to copyright policy limitations. Such limitations do not apply to channels recorded from TNT.
 The video formats supported are quite wide in range including mp4, H264, mp2, mkv, avi and others. Some formats are not supported though firmware updates may increase the number of readable file formats.
 The server automatically detects local network file shares through UPnP and can read videos from any computer on the local network.
 The server's hard drive is available from the local network to Macintosh, Linux, and Windows computers. It can be made available from the WAN. 
 IPTV is available in real-time to any computer on the local network, if the bandwidth is sufficient and the number of simultaneous channels does not exceed 2. However, some channels are not available (most of those that cannot be recorded on an external hard drive).
 The DSL modem router can be configured either as an Ethernet router or a simple DSL modem (bridge mode).
 The server handles 3 Wi-Fi networks: a private Wi-Fi network (possibly hidden) and a so-called "FreeWifi" network which creates a hotspot and allows any other Freebox customer in proximity to connect to the Internet, after entering their Free user name and password, and a hidden network dedicated to IPTV for the Freebox HD (v5) video box if you choose to link this via Wi-Fi.
 The server can be managed through its built-in Web server. Also, TV recordings can be managed from the WAN.
 Because of the changes in the hardware and capabilities, the monthly fee (initially €29.99 including the XDSL line) is now only for the services, a separate cost of €6 is added for XDSL line access, free if you have ADSL over an active POTS (monthly fee €16), but this increase includes modifications in the services fee (see below). It now includes:
 Free calls to any mobile phone in France.
 Calls to landline phones in France and 104 countries, as was already included before.
 Free calls to any phone in France from any Internet connection worldwide.
 Renting the Freebox Revolution Server and its TV box.
 IPTV is now an option (€1.99) so people who are not eligible for such services (i.e. their home is too far away from the DSLAM) do not pay for it, but, as a legal twist, after an increase in VAT in order to reduce the basis of taxes for artistic creation.
 The server can act as a DECT base station for up to 8 DECT handsets.
 The server supports SIP for VoIP phone calls. It allows subscribers to use their smartphone or a dedicated VoIP phone to make calls at Freebox rates instead of using the cellular network.
 The server can use an optical fiber network where available.
 The server is now compatible with Apple's AirPlay and Time Machine technologies (firmware 1.1.0, August 2011).
 A catch-up TV service which covers 33 channels over the past 7 days. This service is proposed in high quality compared to its internet-based counterpart.

The Freebox Player
The Freebox Player is the set-top box part of the "Freebox Revolution" offer. It is connected to the Freebox Server via PLC or by a direct Ethernet cable if both devices are close enough. It is possible to rent another Freebox Player if one wants to connect another TV set in another room.

The Freebox Player device has:
 One Blu-ray/DVD player (Blu-ray playback requires HDMI connection) and an optical sound output.
 One USB (on the front) and one eSata plug to connect hard drives (or a joystick or keyboard for the USB part).
 One DVB-T plug. By contrast with TV over DSL, DNV programs can be recorded to the Freebox Server or to a local hard drive with no restriction about accessing it from a computer.
 One remote control. By contrast with most concurrent devices, the remote control uses Zigbee (standardized power saving low rate low power radio wave) instead of infrared.
 The Freebox player can be controlled from a smartphone or a computer, or an iPad app.
 Every external device connected to the Freebox player is available to that device only but the devices connected to the Freebox Server are available to every Freebox player connected.
 The player can access Internet and e-mail with no computer connected, using either the remote control (which includes gyroscopic control) or from a USB keyboard (not included).
 Games are available from the Free-Store. A USB gamepad is included.
 You can plug in a USB memory stick with photos or music files and watch/play them.

Serving Files to the Freebox Player 
The Freebox Player can access audio/video files on any local computer through UPnP AV. External subtitle files (.srt) should be first be merged with the video file in Matroska format, e.g. with mkvmerge.

V5 generation

The Freebox version 5 was released in April 2006 and expanded the possibilities of the modem. It is now divided into two boxes connected together via high-speed Wifi MIMO or PLC: the first device provides Internet access, Wifi connection and a phone line; the second device is an IPTV set-top box, with advanced TV features like timeshifting, or video on demand. It also supports video games, either specifically designed for the Freebox or using emulation of discontinued video game systems (Master System, Game Gear, Game Boy).

The multimedia element is able to read HDTV IPTV streams and includes a Terrestrial Numerical Television demodulator, can serve as a home A/V broadcasting station, includes a 40Gb hard drive for recording and time-shifting, and a load of A/V ports.

The Network element is an Ethernet hub and a wifi hotspot.

The two elements can be linked via Ethernet, wifi or High-Speed Networking Over the Mains.

The telephony offer via the Freebox offers various services such as free calls between Freebox subscribers and towards the fixed numbers in Metropolitan France, and also free over 100 foreign countries (USA, Canada, UK, Spain, China, India, South America, etc.).

According to Alexandre Archambault from Free, the Freebox is "nothing other than the return to the fundamentals of the DSL", whose initial objective was "to connect via a single support several types of terminals, therefore several types of services: telephone (telephony), microcomputer (Internet access), television set (television transmission, video on demand, pay per view...), hi-fi system (radios, etc.)".

Therefore, it is much more than a simple ADSL modem, which can only make the interface between a computer and the Internet. Free general conditions describe it as "an electronic instrument being used as interface between the data-processing and or audio-visual equipment of the user and the network of Free Telecom".

Technical features

The box is managed by an operating system using a derivative of the Linux kernel. It has many interfaces:
 An Ethernet port 10/100 Mbit/s full/half duplex;
 A USB 2.0 port;
 An HDMI port;
 An RJ11 jack for the ADSL connection;
 An RJ11 jack for phone equipment (two jacks on versions 1 & 2 but only one active);
 A SCART socket
 A digital audio output RCA, or optical S/PDIF starting from version 3;
 An extension port of the serial ATA standard on versions 3 and 4 and parallel ATA standard on versions 1 and 2;
 A host USB port on version 4;

Since version 3, the Freebox can be configured to act as a router. The Freebox version 4 appeared mid-2004 and includes a chipset compatible with the ADSL 2+ standard, as well as a USB port, which will allow, in the long term, the addition of functions such as videoconferencing.

The Freebox OS uses BusyBox.

Now with the v3 (and next), it also provides a VideoLAN client in order to get the movies (in any format VLC understands) stored on the computer and watchable on TV through a playlist selector. This functionality is named Freeplayer.

In the same way, the Freebox (v3 and upper) is able to broadcast TV channels to one or more computers.

References

External links 
 
 Source code

Digital video recorders
Modems
Set-top box